Podgornoye is a rural locality (a sloboda) in Podgorenskoye Urban Settlement, Podgorensky District, Voronezh Oblast, Russia. The population was  3,785 as of 2010. There are 33 streets.

References 

Rural localities in Podgorensky District